Erumeli North  is a village in Kottayam district in the state of Kerala, India.

Demographics
 India census, Erumeli North had a population of 38451 with 18910 males and 19541 females.

References

Villages in Kottayam district